UT Health East Texas (UTHET) is a for-profit hospital system based in Tyler, Texas. UTHET operates ten hospitals, 50 physician's clinics, 13 rehabilitations centers, and six Olympic fitness centers. UTHET also operates the only accredited EMS service in East Texas with 45 ambulances, AIR 1 with 4 helicopters, and HealthFirst Companies which includes a third-party administrator, proprietary East Texas network across 9 counties, medical management company, and a CVO, Centralized Credentialing Services.

References 

Hospital networks in the United States
University of Texas at Tyler
Hospitals in Texas